Jan Otto (8 November 1841, Přibyslav – 29 May 1916, Prague) was a Czech publisher and bookseller. He is best known for Otto's encyclopedia, the largest encyclopedia published in Czech.

Life and work
He was the son of a country doctor. In 1862 he began working as a printer. In 1871, he took over the printing press from his father-in-law Jaroslav Pospíšil. In 1874 he opened a bookstore on Wenceslaus Square in Prague, but after 1910, he concentrated on publishing. After his death his son and son-in-law took over the company but after lasting troubles, went bankrupt in 1934.

In the 1880s he started to work on publishing a complete encyclopedia in Czech. Despite many difficulties, he began publication 1888. It was an immediate commercial success, and publishing continued twenty years.

In addition to the encyclopedia, he published other successful volumes. Ottova světová knihovna (Otto's world library) and Světová četba (World's reading), containing some 2,000 passages translated into Czech. Laciná knihovna národní was a series of affordable but quality books from Czech authors. He also published collections of several authors, Brehm's Life of Animals, and literary newspapers such as Lumír, Zlatá Praha and Světozor. He was active in social and political life of Prague society. In 1912, he was appointed a member of the Austrian House of Lords.

Sources
 Short biography (in Czech)
 History of Otto's encyclopedia (in Czech) (PDF)
 Overview of 19/20th century Czech publishers (in Czech)

External links

 

1841 births
1916 deaths
People from Přibyslav
People from the Kingdom of Bohemia
19th-century Czech businesspeople
19th-century publishers (people)
Czech publishers (people)
Burials at Vyšehrad Cemetery